Gay City News (stylized as gcn) is an free weekly LGBT newspaper based in New York City focusing on local and national issues relating to LGBT community. It was founded in 1994 as Lesbian Gay New York, later LGNY, and was sold to Community Media LLC, owner of The Villager, in 2002, which renamed the publication. It is the largest LGBT newspaper in the United States, with a circulation of 47,000.

Background

Gay City News came into existence after several incarnations. The newspaper began to form in the late 1980s after the collapse of the LGBT newsmagazine OutWeek (which came into existence in 1989 to compete against the then-dominant New York Native—which itself folded in 1997). OutWeek was known for firebrand activist style journalism and provided coverage of a then nascent gay rights movement. It was one of the first publications to undertake scientific reporting on the growing AIDS crisis.

After an investor squabble that closed the magazine, Troy Masters, then an advertising director at OutWeek, led the formation of a group to create a new publication; that publication became known as QW (or QueerWeek), the first glossy gay magazine, and was funded by William F. Chafin. Chafin died before the publication could make a profit, and the magazine was closed upon his death.

Establishment
Two years later, in 1994, Masters sought to establish a newspaper and founded LGNY (Which stood for "Lesbian-Gay New York").  LGNY published for eight years and was relaunched in 2002 as Gay City News. 

Masters continued in his role as publisher until leaving the publication in 2015. He moved to Los Angeles and partnered with the Washington Blade to launch and publish the Los Angeles Blade, now the only LGBT weekly newspaper serving Los Angeles.

Gay City News current editor-in-chief is Paul Schindler, and the associate editor is Duncan Osborne. Its president and publisher is Victoria Schneps-Yunis.

See also
 LGBT culture in New York City

References

External links
Gay City News

Newspapers published in New York City
LGBT-related newspapers published in the United States
LGBT culture in New York City
1994 establishments in New York City
Publications established in 1994
1990s LGBT literature
1994 in LGBT history